Albanian football clubs have competed in European football tournaments since the 1962-63 season when Partizani Tirana played in the European Cup.  Clubs took part in the UEFA Champions League (formerly the European Cup), UEFA Cup, UEFA Cup Winners' Cup, UEFA Europa League, UEFA Europa Conference League and UEFA Intertoto Cup.

General stats

 KF Tirana are the most successful Albanian club, they have won more ties in all competitions (13 times).
 KF Tirana have gone farthest in all competitions, reaching the Round of Sixteen 4 times.
 KF Tirana have participated the most times and played the most games (29 participations & 76 matches).
 Partizani Tirana are the first Albanian club to participate and also won a tie in a European competition UEFA Cup Winners' Cup 1970-71.
 KF Tirana have the most wins for an Albanian team (17).
 Biggest home win: KF Tirana -  Sliema Wanderers 5-0 
 Biggest away win:  Sant Julià - KF Skënderbeu Korçë 0-5
 Biggest home loss: KS Besa - Olympiacos F.C. 0-5
 Biggest away loss:  Motherwell F.C. - KS Flamurtari 8-1

Country coefficient

Summary for ties won

 KF Tirana 13 x 1 tie.
 KF Skënderbeu Korçë 1 x 4 ties, 1 x 2 ties, 1 x 1 tie.
 FK Kukësi 1 x 3 ties, 2 x 2 ties, 2 x 1 tie.
 KF Laçi 1 x 2 ties, 3 x 1 tie.
 KS Flamurtari 1 x 2 ties, 2 x 1 tie.
 KS Vllaznia 6 x 1 tie.
 Partizani Tirana 4 x 1 tie.
 KS Teuta 3 x 1 tie.
 Dinamo Tirana 3 x 1 tie.
 KS Besa 2 x 1 tie.

Above list does not include UEFA Intertoto Cup.

All clubs results full table*

Above list does not include UEFA Intertoto Cup.
Gathered points are based on two-point victories.

Last update 12.08.2021

Tables

Below are summary tables of Albanian clubs results in all competitions.

European Cup / UEFA Champions League 

 PR = Preliminary Round
 QR = Qualifying Round
 1R = First Round
 2R = Second Round
 3R = Third Round
 PO = Play-off Round
 n.d. = Did not play
 w/o = Did not appear

UEFA Cup / UEFA Europa League 

 PR = Preliminary Round
 QR = Qualifying Round
 1R = First Round
 2R = Second Round
 PO = Play-off Round
 GS = Group Stage
 n.d. = Did not play
 w/o = Did not appear

UEFA Conference League 

 PR = Preliminary Round
 QR = Qualifying Round
 1R = First Round
 2R = Second Round
 PO = Play-off Round
 GS = Group Stage
 n.d. = Did not play
 w/o = Did not appear

Last update 28.07.2022

UEFA Cup Winners' Cup 

 PR = Preliminary Round
 QR = Qualifying Round
 1R = First Round
 2R = Second Round
 n.d. = Did not play
 w/o = Did not appear

UEFA Intertoto Cup 

 PR = Preliminary Round
 QR = Qualifying Round
 1R = First Round
 2R = Second Round
 n.d. = Did not play
 w/o = Did not appear

Albanian clubs against countries

 TW = Ties won
 TL = Ties lost

Last update: 01.10.2020

References

 
European football clubs in international competitions